Sai Krishna Medical College & Hospital (SKMCH) is a private medical college based in Rajbiraj, Nepal.  The institute was established in 2004 and operates autonomously under the Tribhuvan University. It is promoted by the Sai Krishna Foundation for Health and Medical Sciences (P) Ltd.. The governing Body of SKMCH is the Medical Council of Nepal, and the Governing Ministry  is the Ministry of Education & Sports of Nepal.

Location
Sai Krishna Medical College & Hospital is located in Rajbiraj, Saptari, Nepal. It has a 300-bed hospital at Rajbiraj and will also be seeking the Sagarmatha Hospital/Government Hospital as its teaching hospital to enable the students to have more practice and observation skills. SKMCH has acquired 16 bighas of land in Rupni, Saptari district area and proposes to construct a 700-bed multi specialty fully automated hospital one of its kind in the region.

Rajbiraj being the only modern days planned town of Nepal-was established in 1942 AD, simulating the “Prastara “planning concept of the Pink City of Jaipur. Population based on Census 2001 is 30,353. Rajbiraj has long been considered an environmentally most suitable place for dwelling purposes. A research study conducted by TU/IOE has found Rajbiraj to be most suitable for Regional Level educational establishment/ training centers.

Establishment of medical college or training institutes for health workers will highly facilitate the poor patients of Saptari, Siraha and Udaypur Districts – who at present go to Dharan, Biratnagar, Kathmandu and Darbhanga (India) for medical treatment. The all around development of Rajbiraj is contingent on the improvements in transport linkage to Indian border towns or  railroad head points. Upgrading of existing road networks (such as Hulaki road) to year-round accessibility status is also highly demanded.

Founders
The initial founders spent about 15 years to establish the project where in most of the time went in to take permissions from government irrespective of political instability in the country. The Promoters, Management and the staff of the institution were totally dedicated and committed to setting up one of the best Campuses in the areas of medical & Para Medical sciences, Agriculture, tissue culture, biotechnology and Pharmacy. The team consists of eminent professionals from Medical, Academic, Engineering, Financial & Business backgrounds. Prominent team member's

Medical and teaching hospital
 750 bed Super Specialty Hospital to be constructed over a period of three years.
 300 bed General Hospital 90% constructed.
 All the required equipment available.
 Additional Specialty equipment for Cardiology already available.
 OPD & Emergency services started from 26 November 2005.

Medical sciences education
The courses offered by the institute are:
 MBBS (Pending)
 BDS (Pending)
 BSc Nursing
 BVS
 BPT/BMLT (Pending)
 Diploma's & Certificate level courses
 Clinical Practice Programs
 Agriculture & Veterinary Sciences Courses

Research laboratories
 Pathology
 Pharmacy
 Tissue Culture
 Bio Technology

References

https://thehimalayantimes.com/nepal/isolation-centre-vandalised-over-food-quality/
https://kathmandupost.com/province-no-2/2020/05/31/province-2-expands-its-isolation-capacity-as-covid-19-cases-continue-to-rise

Further reading

See also
 List of educational institutions in Rajbiraj

Universities and colleges in Nepal
2004 establishments in Nepal
Educational institutions established in 2004